Brian Page Senior (born 8 May 1966) is a former professional tennis player from the United States.

Biography
Born in Minnesota, Page later moved to Chicago and attended Marist High School. From 1985 to 1988 he went to Clemson University where he earned multiple All-ACC selections while on the varsity tennis team. He won the United States Amateur Championships in 1987.

Page, who turned professional in 1988, won a doubles title in 1989 at a Challenger event in Jakarta. He was a doubles finalist at the 1990 Prudential-Bache Securities Classic in Orlando, a tournament on the ATP Tour, with Alfonso Mora as his partner. They lost the final to Scott Davis and David Pate. During his career he competed in the men's doubles draws of all four Grand Slam tournaments. He made the second round once, at the 1990 French Open.

Since 1992 he has been the Director of Tennis at Ruth Lake Country Club in Hinsdale, Illinois.

His son, Brian Page Jr, competes on the ITF Futures and ATP Challenger circuits.

ATP Tour career finals

Doubles: 1 (0–1)

Challenger titles

Doubles: (1)

References

External links
 
 

1966 births
Living people
American male tennis players
Tennis players from Chicago
Clemson Tigers men's tennis players